The 2009 Misano Superbike World Championship round was the eighth round of the 2009 Superbike World Championship season. It took place on the weekend of June 19–21, 2009 at the Misano Adriatico circuit.

Results

Superbike race 1

Superbike race 2

Supersport race
The Supersport race was stopped after 8 laps, because of an accident that spilled oil on the track. It was later restarted, with the final result being the aggregate of the two heats.

References
 Superbike Race 1 (Archived 2009-07-31)
 Superbike Race 2
 Supersport Race

External links
 The official website of the Misano World Circuit
 The official website of the Superbike World Championship

Misano Round
Misano